Alphonse Guépin (17 February 1808 in Uzel – 8 December 1878 in Saint-Brieuc) was a French architect and building restorer.

He was specialized in churches in Côtes-d'Armor.
 Saint-Pierre church in Plessala
 Saint-Gwénaël church in Lescouët-Gouarec
 Church in Plouézec
 Church in Lanrivain
 Anatole-le-Braz school in Saint-Brieuc

His main building was the Court in Saint-Brieuc, built in 1863.

References

19th-century French architects
1808 births
1878 deaths
French ecclesiastical architects